Pseudocossus pljustchi is a moth in the family Cossidae. It was described by Yakovlev and Saldaitis in 2011. It is found in Madagascar.

References

Natural History Museum Lepidoptera generic names catalog

Moths described in 2011
Pseudocossinae